Sex Education: Sexuality, Society and Learning is a peer-reviewed academic journal covering sex education. It was established in 2001, with Michael Reiss (University of London) as the founding editor-in-chief. It is published 6 times a year by Routledge and the current editor-in-chief is Peter Aggleton (University of New South Wales). According to the Journal Citation Reports, the journal has a 2017 impact factor of 1.649, ranking it 86th out of 238 journals in the category "Education & Educational Research".

References

External links

Routledge academic journals
Triannual journals
Publications established in 2001
English-language journals
Education journals
Sexology journals
Sex education